Mount Freed is a mountain,  high, that surmounts the divide between Champness Glacier and McCann Glacier, in the southern part of the Bowers Mountains of Victoria Land, Antarctica. The topographical feature was first mapped by the United States Geological Survey from surveys and U.S. Navy air photos, 1960–62, and was named by the Advisory Committee on Antarctic Names for Commander M.G. Freed, legal officer on the staff of the Commander, U.S. Naval Support Force, Antarctica, 1966–68. The mountain lies situated on the Pennell Coast, a portion of Antarctica lying between Cape Williams and Cape Adare.

References

Mountains of Victoria Land
Pennell Coast